

280001–280100 

|-bgcolor=#f2f2f2
| colspan=4 align=center | 
|}

280101–280200 

|-bgcolor=#f2f2f2
| colspan=4 align=center | 
|}

280201–280300 

|-bgcolor=#f2f2f2
| colspan=4 align=center | 
|}

280301–280400 

|-bgcolor=#f2f2f2
| colspan=4 align=center | 
|}

280401–280500 

|-bgcolor=#f2f2f2
| colspan=4 align=center | 
|}

280501–280600 

|-bgcolor=#f2f2f2
| colspan=4 align=center | 
|}

280601–280700 

|-id=640
| 280640 Ruetsch ||  || Simon Ruetsch (born 1996), a member of the Jura Astronomy Society in Switzerland || 
|-id=641
| 280641 Edosara ||  || Edoardo Rossi (born 1998) and Sara Breschi (born 1996), two amateur astronomers at the Pistoia Mountains Astronomical Observatory in Italy || 
|-id=642
| 280642 Doubs ||  || The Doubs, a 453-km-long river in eastern France and western Switzerland, tributary of the Saône. || 
|-id=652
| 280652 Aimaku || 2005 CQ || AIMAKU, the Italian association for people who suffer from alkaptonuria (genetic disease) || 
|}

280701–280800 

|-bgcolor=#f2f2f2
| colspan=4 align=center | 
|}

280801–280900 

|-bgcolor=#f2f2f2
| colspan=4 align=center | 
|}

280901–281000 

|-bgcolor=#f2f2f2
| colspan=4 align=center | 
|}

References 

280001-281000